Baylor College of Medicine (BCM) is a medical school and research center in Houston, Texas, within the Texas Medical Center, the world's largest medical center. BCM is composed of four academic components: the School of Medicine, the Graduate School of Biomedical Sciences; the School of Health Professions, and the National School of Tropical Medicine.

The school is part owner, alongside Catholic Health Initiatives (CHI), of Baylor St. Luke's Medical Center, the flagship hospital of the CHI St. Luke's Health system. Other affiliated teaching hospitals and research institutes include Harris Health System's Ben Taub Hospital, Texas Children's Hospital, The University of Texas MD Anderson Cancer Center, TIRR Memorial Hermann, the Menninger Clinic, the Michael E. DeBakey VA Medical Center, and the Children's Hospital of San Antonio. On November 18, 2020, Baylor College of Medicine announced a new affiliation with Baylor Scott & White Health. This will result in the development of a new regional medical school campus in Temple, Texas, which will enroll 40 students per year starting in Fall 2023.

Baylor College of Medicine's academic programs are consistently ranked among the top tier in the country in their respective fields. Additionally, the National School of Tropical Medicine is the only school in the nation dedicated exclusively to patient care, research, education and policy related to neglected tropical diseases.

History

Baylor College of Medicine was founded in 1900 in Dallas, Texas, by a group of Dallas physicians as the University of Dallas Medical Department, despite the absence of any institution under the University of Dallas name. This occurred following a meeting of Dallas area physicians on August 16, 1900, for the purpose taking the preliminary steps to establish a medical college. The majority of physicians in attendance opposed the creation of a medical college; however, the remaining physicians in favor set up a committee of medical professional and three laymen to secure a board of directors for the proposed college. The committee elected a 13-member board of directors consisting of both physicians and local citizens, with Dr. Samuel H. Stout chairman of the board and W. J. Moroney as secretary.

The school's charter was filed with the Texas Secretary of State on September 15, 1900, with three physicians as the incorporators: Drs. Samuel E. Milliken, J. B. Titterington, and Lawrence Ashton. The school opened on November 19, 1900, with 81 students in a former synagogue, Temple Emanu-el, located at 292 Commerce Street (today 1306 Commerce Street).

Dr. Albert Ferdinand Beddoe, A.B., M.D. was a co-founder, alongside Samuel Hollingsworth Stout, who served as its founding dean from 1902 to 1903. Meanwhile, Beddoe established the chair of Diseases of Children and became a professor. He built up the free clinic in connection with Baylor hospital.

In 1903, an alliance with Baylor University in Waco was formed and the name was changed to Baylor University College of Medicine.

By 1918, Baylor University College of Medicine was the only private medical school in Texas.

Relocation to Houston 
The M.D. Anderson Foundation invited Baylor to join the newly formed Texas Medical Center in Houston in 1943. The school opened in the medical center July 12, 1943, in a converted Sears, Roebuck & Co. warehouse, with 131 students. Four years later, Baylor moved to its present site in the Roy and Lillie Cullen Building, the first building completed in the Texas Medical Center.

In 1948, Michael E. DeBakey joined the faculty as chair of the Department of Surgery, and the following year, the Graduate School of Biomedical Sciences was established. Baylor's rise in prominence began in the 1950s when DeBakey's surgical techniques garnered international attention. In the 1960s, the college underwent its first major expansion.

Independence and expansion 
In 1969, the college separated from Baylor University and became an independent institution, which allowed it access to federal research funding, changing its name to Baylor College of Medicine. That same year, BCM negotiated with the Texas Legislature to double its class size in order to increase the number of physicians in Texas.

Disaffiliation from Houston Methodist Hospital 
In 2004, Baylor did not renew its affiliation agreement with Houston Methodist Hospital, the school's primary private adult teaching hospital, following contentious discussions between the two institutions. This split is notable as the only instance in American medical history of a medical school and one of its primary teaching hospitals parting ways.

Recent history 
In 2005, Baylor College of Medicine began building a hospital and clinic, to be called the Baylor Clinic and Hospital, slated to open in 2011. In 2009, the college postponed construction for financial reasons, with the outer shell of the hospital completed but the interiors remaining unfinished.  In March 2012, BCM decided to convert the building to an outpatient clinic center. In 2009, BCM entered into discussions with Rice University regarding a potential merger between the two Houston institutions. After extensive meetings, the boards at both institutions decided that each school would remain independent. In 2010, Baylor University entered into talks with BCM to strengthening ties to each other; however, the merger did not occur. Baylor University Board of Regents appoints 25% of the Baylor College of Medicine's Board of Trustees.

On June 21, 2010, Dr. Paul Klotman was named as the President and CEO of the Baylor College of Medicine.

In January 2014, BCM and CHI St. Luke's announced they would become joint owners of Baylor St. Luke's Medical Center, a hospital at the Texas Medical Center (formerly known as St. Luke's Episcopal Hospital, then St. Luke's Medical Center after it was purchased by Catholic Health Initiatives in 2013). A partially completed hospital building on the BCM–McNair Campus is slated to open in 2015 and will become BCM's acute-care hospital and main medical teaching facility.

On November 18, 2020, Baylor College of Medicine announced a new affiliation with Baylor Scott & White Health that will result in the development of a new regional medical school campus in Temple, Texas which will enroll 40 students per year starting in Fall 2023.

Reputation 
The School of Medicine has been consistently considered in the top tier of programs in the country, and is particularly noted for having the lowest tuition among all private medical schools in the US. The Graduate School of Biomedical Sciences is among the top 25 graduate schools in the United States. Within the School of Health Professions, the Nurse anesthetist program ranks 2nd and the physician assistant program ranks 3rd. A program in Orthotics and Prosthetics began in 2013, with 18 students in the first class. The National School of Tropical Medicine is the only school in the nation dedicated exclusively to patient care, research, education and policy related to neglected tropical diseases. A program in Genetic Counseling began in 2018, with 8 students in the first class.

School of Medicine
Each year the medical school matriculates around 185 students, around 75% of whom are Texas residents. As of April 2020, Baylor College of Medicine is the third least expensive private medical school in the country in terms of tuition.

Curriculum 
The MD curriculum consists of 1.5 years of preclinical foundational sciences, followed by 2.5 years of clinical curriculum.

It is one of the few medical schools in the United States that is structured with an accelerated 1.5 year preclinical curriculum.

Dual degree programs 
Baylor offers four programs that give medical students the opportunity to earn a second degree alongside the Doctor of Medicine (MD) degree.

 MD/PhD with the Graduate School of Biomedical Sciences
 MD/MPH with the UTHealth School of Public Health
 MD/MBA with the Rice University Jesse H. Jones School of Business
 MD/JD with the University of Houston Law Center

Baylor College of Medicine is one of only 51 medical institutions in the United States to offer a Medical Scientist Training Program. This federally sponsored and highly competitive program allows exceptionally well-qualified students to study for a combined MD and Ph.D. in a medical science to be earned in 7–9 total years.  Typically, 8–12 students matriculate into this program per year and receive free tuition in addition to a stipend of $29,000 per academic year.

Graduate School of Biomedical Sciences
The Baylor College of Medicine Graduate School of Biomedical Sciences (GSBS) offers degrees in eight interdisciplinary fields:
 Cancer & Cell Biology
 Chemical, Physical, & Structural Biology
 Clinical Investigation
 Development, Disease Models, & Therapeutics
 Genetics & Genomics
 Immunology & Microbiology
 Neuroscience
 Quantitative & Computational Biosciences

Each of the graduate programs offers a Doctor of Philosophy (Ph.D.) degree, while the Clinical Scientist Training Program offers a Master of Science (M.S.) degree that can lead to a Ph.D. The GSBS is also home to a Certificate of Added Qualification program in Clinical Translational Research for Ph.D. students and a Certificate of Completion in Biomedical Sciences & Health Equity, open to post-baccalaureate students seeking to improve their application portfolios for medical school.  

The GSBS ranks 25th for best Ph.D. program in the biological sciences.
Overall, in 2018 BCM ranked 20th in terms of research funding from the National Institutes of Health based on rankings done by the Blue Ridge Institute. Baylor also ranked in the top 20 in eight specialty areas, including number one in the nation for Genetics.

BCM's research faculty includes seven members of the National Academy of Sciences, 14 members of the Institute of Medicine and three members of the Howard Hughes Medical Institute.

About 100 students join the graduate program each year, of which one half were women and one third were graduates from foreign schools.

Many departments of the graduate school collaborate with Rice University and other institutions within the Texas Medical Center. Currently, 615 graduate students are enrolled in one of the seven PhD programs.

School of Health Professions
Physician Assistant

The School's Physician Assistant Program which began in 1971 as a certificate program, was elevated to Bachelor of Science status in 1975, and on to a Master of Science program in 1989.  Today, this program ranks 3rd among the nation's physician assistant programs according to U.S. News & World Report.

Nurse Anesthesia

The 2012 graduates of the Graduate Program in Nurse Anesthesia Program were the first to earn their doctorate of nursing practice from the Program. Developed from a 1968 a certificate program that was offered by the Harris County Hospital District, now the Harris Health System, in 1983, it became a Master of Science degree program under the auspices of Baylor. This program ranks 2nd in the nation among training programs in nurse anesthesia according to U.S. News & World Report.

Orthotics and Prosethetics

The Orthotics and Prosthetics Program welcomed its first students in June 2013. It is a 30-month program, where the first 12 months are dedicated to the didactic curriculum, and the following 18 months are spent on clinical rotations and research. It Is the only program in the country to integrate a series of full-time clinical rotations exposing students to six core areas of expertise designed to meet the requirements of the NCOPE-approved residency.

Genetic Counseling

In 2018, the Genetic Counseling Program welcomed its first students. It is a 21-month program consisting of didactic coursework, clinical rotations, and a student thesis. Genetic counseling students rotate through prenatal, pediatric, adult, cancer, and specialty clinics at Baylor College of Medicine and its affiliated hospitals in and around the Texas Medical Center.

National School of Tropical Medicine
Baylor College of Medicine National School of Tropical Medicine is one of the first of its kind in North America devoted to education, healthcare delivery, research and policy related to the neglected diseases that disproportionately afflict "the bottom billion", the world's poorest people who live below the World Bank poverty level.

The School currently offers a Diploma in Tropical Medicine program as well as several non-degree courses and seminars for undergraduates, graduate students and professionals. Plans are in development for masters and doctorate programs.

The School provides clinical services at the Tropical Medicine Clinic at Harris Health System's Smith Clinic, which opened on October 6, 2011. The mission of the Clinic is to prevent, diagnose, and treat common and neglected tropical diseases in the Houston metropolitan population and to improve occupational health for those working in regions where tropical diseases thrive. Baylor Travel Medicine, an affiliate of the National School of Tropical Medicine, opened on May 10, 2012, offers medications, immunizations, counseling, and information customized for each patient's health needs.

The National School of Tropical Medicine also conducts a comprehensive research and development program for producing a new generation of drugs, diagnostics and vaccines for the Neglected Tropical Diseases (NTDs) and Neglected Infections of Poverty (NIoPs), as well as fundamental and applied research against these diseases.

Residency training
Baylor College of Medicine sponsors Graduate Medical Education in more than 80 ACGME-accredited, and 40 Texas Medical Board (TMB)-approved training programs.

At Baylor College of Medicine residents and fellows learn from one of the most diverse patient populations anywhere in the country. This is partially due to the diversity found within the city of Houston, which has no single majority ethnic group. The hospitals of the Texas Medical Center and Houston's status as a hub for international industry also draw patients from every corner of the globe. Adding to this diversity are the many and varied settings in which residents and fellows have the opportunity to train, including Baylor St. Luke's Medical Center and Baylor's many affiliated hospitals.

Research

Biomedical research 
In 2013, Baylor College of Medicine ranked 19th in terms of research funding from the National Institutes of Health based on rankings done by the Blue Ridge Institute,. Baylor also ranked in the top 20 in eight specialty areas, including number one in the nation for Genetics.

BCM's research faculty includes seven members of the National Academy of Sciences, 14 members of the Institute of Medicine and three members of the Howard Hughes Medical Institute.

Centers 
Housed within this research space are a number of centers and facilities, such as:

Human Genome Sequencing Center
The Human Neuroimaging Lab
The Dan L. Duncan Comprehensive Cancer Center
The Center for Cell and Gene Therapy
The Huffington Center on Aging
The Vaccine Research Center
The National Center for Macromolecular Imaging
The W.M. Keck Center for Computational Biology
The Epigenomics Data Analysis and Coordination Center
Core facilities, including microscopy, DNA sequencing, microarray, and protein sequencing
One of the largest transgenic mouse facilities in the country
Center for Medical Ethics and Health Policy
Center for Precision Environmental Health
Children’s Nutrition Research Center
The Dan L Duncan Institute for Clinical and Translational Research
National School of Tropical Medicine
Office of Outreach and Health Disparities of the Dan L Duncan Comprehensive Cancer Center
Undiagnosed Diseases Network

Baylor St. Luke's Medical Center
BCM is a co-owner of Baylor St. Luke's Medical Center, part of CHI St. Luke's Health. It serves as the primary private adult teaching hospital for the college and ranks among the best hospitals in the nation for cardiology and heart surgery, diabetes and endocrinology, gastroenterology and GI surgery, neurology and neurosurgery, and pulmonology in U.S. News & World Report.

Hospital affiliations

BCM is affiliated with many of the hospitals of the Texas Medical Center. BCM's affiliations include:

Cooperating patient care institutions

 Community Health Centers
 Cullen Bayou Place
DePelchin Children's Center
 Houston Child Guidance Center
 Jewish Family Service Cancer Center
Kelsey-Seybold Clinic
 Park Plaza Hospital
 Quentin Mease Hospital
 Seven Acres Jewish Geriatric Center
 Houston Shriners Hospital (orthopedic)
 Thomas Street Health Center
Woman's Hospital of Texas

Baylor International Pediatric AIDS Initiative
The Baylor International Pediatric AIDS Initiative (BIPAI) at Baylor College of Medicine and Texas Children's Hospital was established in 1996, and has rapidly become the world's largest university-based program dedicated to global pediatric and family HIV/AIDS care and treatment, health professional training and clinical research. Baylor constructed and opened the world's two largest centers for the care and treatment of HIV-infected children and families, the Romanian-American Children's Center in Constanta, Romania in 2001, and the Botswana-Baylor Children's Clinical Center of Excellence in Gaborone, Botswana in 2003, followed by Uganda, Lesotho, Swaziland, Malawi, and Tanzania, where it has entered into partnership with the Ministries of Health to scale up pediatric HIV/AIDS care and treatment, and build and open new Children's Clinical Centers of Excellence.

BIPAI also has created the Pediatric AIDS Corps, a model program to place up to 250 American pediatricians and infectious disease specialists in its African centers to vastly expand capacity for pediatric HIV/AIDS care and treatment and health professional training. Major funders of BIPAI's activities include NIH, Centers for Disease Control and Prevention (CDC), the Bristol-Myers Squibb Foundation, Abbott Laboratories, and numerous private and corporate foundations.

Notable faculty members

Christopher Amos, PhD — Genetic epidemiologist (cancer)
Sharmila Anandasabapathy, MD — Gastroenterologist, global health
Oluwatoyin Asojo, PhD — Crystallographer, tropical medicine
John C. Baldwin, MD — Cardiovascular surgeon. First successful heart "auto-transplantation" to repair a cardiac tumor
Andrea Ballabio, MD — Geneticist
Arthur L. Beaudet, M.D. — Geneticist, member of the National Academy of Sciences.
Christine Beeton, PhD — Immunologist
Hugo J. Bellen — Developmental biologist; Howard Hughes Medical investigator.
Malcolm Brenner, MD, PhD. Geneticist.
William "Bill" R. Brinkley — Cell biologist and early contributor to discovery of mitotic spindle apparatus
William E. Brownell, PhD — Biophysicist, researcher into mammalian hearing
F. Charles Brunicardi, MD — Surgeon. Editor-in-Chief of Schwartz's Principles of Surgery
Janet S. Butel, PhD — Molecular virologist
Selma Calmes, MD — Anesthesiologist.
C. Thomas Caskey — Internist, geneticist and biomedical entrepreneur. Discovered/investigated universality of the genetic code and its stop/start mechanism. Howard Hughes Medical Investigator.
Wah Chiu, PhD — Biophysicist
Denton Cooley, MD — Cardiovascular surgeon. Innovations include aortic aneurysm repair, heart valve replacement, bloodless cardiac surgery for Jehovah’s Witnesses, 1st successful implantation of artificial heart. Founder of the Texas Heart Institute. Winner, Presidential Medal of Freedom.
Michael E. DeBakey, MD — Cardiovascular surgeon. Innovations include coronary bypass, carotid endarterectomy, artificial heart, ventricular assist device, aortic aneurysm repair. Winner, Presidential Medal of Freedom, National Medal of Science, Congressional Gold Medal.
David Eagleman, PhD — Neuroscientist, popular writer
Hashem El-Serag, MD — Internist and gastroenterologist
Ralph Feigin, MD — Pediatrician (infectious diseases). Editor-in-Chief, Textbook of Pediatric Infectious Diseases
Charles Fraser, MD — Pediatric surgeon
O. H. Frazier, MD — Cardiovascular surgeon (heart transplants).
Glen Gabbard, MD — Psychiatrist and psychoanalyst
Richard A. Gibbs, PhD — Geneticist
Margaret Goodell, PhD — Cancer biologist (stem cells)
Wayne Goodman, MD — Psychiatrist. Co-developer, Yale–Brown Obsessive Compulsive Scale
David C. Hilmers, MD, MS, MPH — Astronaut, internist, pediatrician
Donald Holmquest, MD, PhD, JD — Astronaut, radiologist (nuclear medicine), attorney
Peter Hotez, MD, PhD — Pediatrician (infectious diseases), tropical medicine
Mark Kline, MD — Pediatrician (infectious diseases, HIV/AIDS).
Peter H. Lin, MD — Cardiovascular surgeon
James R. Lupski, MD, PhD — Molecular geneticist. Co-discoverer, Potocki-Lupski syndrome
Kenneth Mattox, MD — Surgeon
Elizabeth McIngvale, PhD — Social worker (OCD advocate)
Read Montague, PhD — Neuroscientist
Daniel Musher — Microbiologist.
David L. Nelson, PhD — Cancer researcher
Bert W. O'Malley — Geneticist. National Medal of Science winner. Member, National Academy of Sciences.
C. Kent Osborne, MD — Oncologist.
David Poplack, MD — Pediatric oncologist.
Lorraine Potocki, PhD — Medical geneticist. Co discoverer, Potocki-Lupski syndrome and Potocki-Shaffer syndrome
Michael J. Reardon, MD — Cardiovascular surgeon. First successful cardiac auto transplantation for cardiac sarcoma.
JoAnne S. Richards, PhD — Cell biologist (ovarian cancer). Member, American Academy of Arts and Sciences
Susan M. Rosenberg, PhD — Cancer researcher (DNA mutations)
Kevin Slawin, MD — Urologist
David Sugarbaker, MD — Cardiovascular surgeon
Huda Zoghbi — Neuropsychiatrist. Member of National Academy of Sciences; Howard Hughes investigator
Blaž Zupan, PhD — Computer scientist

In culture
The male Asian elephant calf born to Shanti at the Houston Zoo on May 4, 2010, was named Baylor in honor of the college and their research on elephant herpesvirus.

Affiliated schools
 Michael E. DeBakey High School for Health Professions
 Baylor College of Medicine Academy at Ryan
 Baylor College of Medicine Biotech Academy at Rusk

References

External links
 Official website

Baylor College of Medicine
Institutions in the Texas Medical Center
Medical schools in Texas
Universities and colleges in Houston
Educational institutions established in 1900
Universities and colleges accredited by the Southern Association of Colleges and Schools
Tropical medicine organizations
1900 establishments in Texas